James Lockhart (born 16 October 1930) is a Scottish conductor, pianist and organist who served as music director for a number of organisations.

Lockhart was born on 16 October 1930 in Edinburgh and studied at the Royal College of Music. In March 1954 he gave the first UK performance of Frank Martin's Sonata da Chiesa for Viola d'Amore and Organ at All Souls Church, Langham Place with the violist Harry Danks. He was the Royal College of Music's director of opera from 1986 to 1992. He appeared as a castaway on the BBC Radio programme Desert Island Discs on 18 April 1970.

References 

1930 births
Living people
Scottish conductors (music)
British male conductors (music)
Music directors (opera)
Musicians from Edinburgh
Scottish pianists
Scottish organists
British male organists
21st-century British conductors (music)
21st-century pianists
21st-century organists
21st-century British male musicians